Andrea Deodati, O.S.B (1629–1713) was a Roman Catholic prelate who served as Archbishop of Rossano (1697–1713).

Biography
Andrea Deodati was born in Castellane, Italy on 12 October 1629 and ordained a priest in the Order of Saint Benedict on 2 June 1647.
On 1 July 1697, he was appointed during the papacy of Pope Innocent XII as Archbishop of Rossano.
On 7 July 1697, he was consecrated bishop by Bandino Panciatici, Cardinal-Priest of San Pancrazio, with Prospero Bottini, Titular Archbishop of Myra, and Marcello d'Aste, Titular Archbishop of Athenae, serving as co-consecrators. 
He served as Archbishop of Rossano until his death on 7 August 1713.

References

External links and additional sources
 (for Chronology of Bishops)
 (for Chronology of Bishops)

17th-century Italian Roman Catholic archbishops
18th-century Italian Roman Catholic archbishops
Bishops appointed by Pope Innocent XII
1629 births
1713 deaths
People from Alpes-de-Haute-Provence